"I'm Not Lisa" is a song by American country music artist Jessi Colter. It was released on January 16, 1975, as the lead single from her album I'm Jessi Colter. The song was Colter's first major hit as a solo artist.

Content
"I'm Not Lisa" was written by Colter and describes the pain that comes with dating someone who has not gotten over a previous lover. The previous lover, named Lisa, was taken away by "His hand", which implies that she died or left with another man. The song is sung from the perspective of the man's current lover named Julie who laments the fact that he can't get over Lisa.

While singing on the recording of the original version of the song, Colter also played the song's piano accompaniment on the keyboards. The song was produced by Ken Mansfield and Colter's husband, Waylon Jennings. Both men would also produce Colter's 1975 album, as well as her further releases for Capitol records.<ref>{{cite web|url=http://www.discogs.com/Jessi-Colter-Im-Not-Lisa/release/1175592|title=Jessi Colter - "Im Not Lisa" (7)|publisher=Discogs.com|access-date=2009-07-17}}</ref>

Chart performance
"I'm Not Lisa" was released on Capitol Records on January 16, 1975, making its debut on the country chart February 15, 1975. The song became Colter's commercial breakthrough as a solo artist, peaking at number 1 on the Billboard Hot Country Songs chart. It also was a major crossover Pop hit, peaking at #4 on the Billboard Hot 100 and subsequently ranking as the 40th most popular song on Billboard's Year-End chart for 1975. In addition, the song also reached #16 on the Hot Adult Contemporary Tracks chart, and was released on Colter's debut Capitol album, I'm Jessi Colter. The song earned Colter a Grammy award nomination in the category of Best Female Country Vocal Performance and a Country Music Association Awards nomination.

"I'm Not Lisa" became Colter's signature tune and her only number 1 single.

Weekly charts

Year-end charts

Cover versions
The song has since been covered by many artists, including Lynn Anderson, Rosemary Clooney, Marianne Faithfull, Faith Hill, Anne Kirkpatrick, Nana Mouskouri (as "Je ne suis pas Lisa" French), and Tanya Tucker. Elizabeth Cook recorded a version for her 2002 album Hey, Y'all. Robert L. Doerschuk of AllMusic praised Cook's cover for "affirm[ing] the power of unadulterated old-time country and Cook's complete command of this idiom". In 2005, Erika Jo recorded a version for her self-titled debut album, and also released it as single to country radio, but it failed to chart. Deana Carter performed a cover of the song with Colter for her 2007 album, The Chain. The rock band Killdozer also covered "I'm Not Lisa" on their 1986 release Burl''.

References

1975 singles
Jessi Colter songs
Songs written by Jessi Colter
1975 songs
Capitol Records singles